Raymond Gniewek  (November 13, 1931 – October 1, 2021) was an American violinist.

He served as concertmaster of the Metropolitan Opera orchestra for 43 years; upon his appointment in 1957 he was the youngest person to ever hold the post.  He also had a career as a soloist. His final performance as concertmaster with the orchestra was a concert performance in Carnegie Hall of Béla Bartók's Bluebeard's Castle in 2000.

Gniewek was a native of New York City, where he began his musical education; he continued at the Eastman School of Music, studying with Andre de Ribaupierre and Joseph Knitzer, becoming concertmaster of the Eastman Rochester Orchestra and associate concertmaster of Rochester Philharmonic under Erich Leinsdorf. Other teachers were the Canadian violinist Albert Pratz and Raphael Bronstein of New York City.

Gniewek was married to soprano Judith Blegen. He was formerly married to ballet dancer and Pilates instructor Lolita San Miguel. His sister is Cecilia Brauer who plays celesta and glass harmonica in the Met Orchestra.

Gniewek was born in East Meadow, New York, and died on October 1, 2021.

Videography
 Mozart: Idomeneo (1982), Deutsche Grammophon DVD, 00440-073-4234, 2006
 The Metropolitan Opera Centennial Gala (1983), Deutsche Grammophon DVD, 00440-073-4538, 2009
 The Metropolitan Opera Gala 1991, Deutsche Grammophon DVD, 00440-073-4582, 2010
 James Levine's 25th Anniversary Metropolitan Opera Gala (1996), Deutsche Grammophon DVD, B0004602-09, 2005

References

External links
 
 

1931 births
2021 deaths
American classical violinists
American male violinists
Concertmasters
Eastman School of Music alumni
Musicians from New York City
Metropolitan Opera people
21st-century classical violinists
21st-century American male musicians
Male classical violinists
20th-century classical violinists
20th-century American male musicians
Classical musicians from New York (state)
20th-century American violinists
21st-century American violinists